Calamidia hirta is a moth of the family Erebidae. It is found in Australia, from Queensland to Tasmania.

References

Lithosiina
Moths described in 1854